Ruthann Robson is an American professor of law and University Distinguished Professor. As well as her writings in legal scholarship and theory, she has also published fiction, poetry, and creative nonfiction. Her novel Eye of a Hurricane was a finalist for the Lambda Literary Award for LGBT Debut Fiction.

Career 
She has taught at the City University of New York School of Law since 1990 in the areas of constitutional law, family law, feminist legal theory, and sexuality and the law. The New York City Law Review published a symposium on her work in volume 8, issue 2.

In 2007, the CUNY board of Trustees designated Professor Ruthann Robson a University Distinguished Professor. A profile by Jill Jarvis is featured on the CUNY website. A profile by Emily Sachar is featured in CUNY Law, the law school magazine.

Publications 
Sappho Goes to Law School
Lesbian (Out)Law: Survival Under the Rule of Law
a/k/a
The Struggle for Happiness (both from St. Martin's Press)
Cecile
Eye of a Hurricane
re*view (ri*vyōō')

Awards and fellowships 
Ferro-Grumley Award for LGBT Fiction for Eye of a Hurricane
Fellow in Nonfiction Literature, New York Foundation for the Arts
Bram Fischer Research Chair, Witwatersrand (WITS) Law School, Johannesburg, South Africa
Collaborative Research Fellowship, University of Sydney
Djerassi Artists Fellowship Residency
CALI (Center for Computer-Assisted Legal Instruction) Law Fellowship

References

External links 
Official Website
Constitutional Law Prof Blog

American legal writers
Living people
City University of New York faculty
American lesbian writers
American women non-fiction writers
American women academics
21st-century American women writers
1956 births